Yashwant Stadium is a football stadium in Nagpur, India. It has a maximum standing capacity of 50,000 for football matches. It hosted Nagpur Premier League football matches in front of capacity crowds.

References

Football venues in Maharashtra
Sport in Nagpur
Buildings and structures in Nagpur
Sports venues in Maharashtra
Sports venues in Nagpur
2012 establishments in Maharashtra
Sport in Vidarbha
Sports venues completed in 2012